The Energy Identification Code or EIC is a 16-character identifier (code) used in Europe to uniquely identify market participants and energy resources (entities and objects) related to the electricity and gas sector.

EIC codes are used for:
 Transmission System Operators, Market Participants such as traders, producers, consumers, power exchanges, grid operators, suppliers, agents, service providers, etc.
 Local grids where metering points are situated, Market Balance Areas consisting of several local grids, Control Areas, Bidding Zones, etc. 
 The physical lines that connect adjacent market (balance) areas or internal lines within an area, including Transmission lines.
 Metering points
 Physical or logical places where an identified object or the IT system of an identified object is or could be located. 
 Any object that generates or consumes energy, including Substations, Generation units and Power plants.

The EIC codes are used — among others — in platforms that support EU regulations on transparency and integrity:
 ENTSO-E Transparency Platform for electricity
 ENTSO-G Transparency Platform for gas
 ARIS platform

Actors involved in the EIC coding scheme
The scheme is supported by a central issuing office (CIO), function exercised by ENTSO-E for both the electricity and the gas sectors) and ENTSO-E-authorised local issuing offices (LIOs) in Europe.

On 2021-12-16, IANA registered the urn:eic URN namespace, so now EIC can be used in making semantic triples of Common Information Model (electricity) data or other energy Linked Open Data.

References

Electric power transmission in Europe